Obukhovo is an urban locality (a work settlement) in Noginsky District of Moscow Oblast, Russia, located  east from Moscow. Population:

Overview
The settlement is divided into two parts by the M7 auto route.

Two rivers flow through Obukhovo: the Klyazma and the Shalovka (Klyazma's tributary).

Obukhovo used to be a famous center of textile industry. Its core enterprises were a sand pit and two carpet factories. Bankruptcy of the factories led to their closure in 2002.

History
Obukhovo was first mentioned in a book about Moscow region written in 1573–1574. In 1708, English businessman Andrew Stales built a powder mill in Obukhovo, which later manufactured gunpowder. In the first half of the 19th century the powder mill underwent bankruptcy and was sold on auction.

In 1775, Obukhovskaya suburb was organized near the powder mill.

In 1852, Anisim Tyulyaev built a clothing factory and in 1857 Mikhail Brunov built a carpet factory in Obukhovskaya suburb. After the October Revolution, both factories were nationalized. In 1958, the factories merged under the name of "Lenin Carpet and Clothing Enterprise of Obukhovo".

On May 21, 1928, the settlement was granted urban-type settlement status and renamed Obukhovo.

In 2002, "The Carpets of Obukhovo" Joint Stock Company (former "Lenin carpet and cloth combine of Obukhovo") went bankrupt and in 2006 it was liquidated.

Demographics

Sports
The settlement is also well known as one of the bandy centres of Russia. Many players from Obukhovo has become World Champions. Sportivny Klub Obukhovo is the only club outside the highest division of Russian Bandy Super League to have an artificial ice. Obukhovo has hosted several Youth World Championships.  In February 2011 it was for Girls-17, in December 2011 for Boys-23, in which the Russian team was victorious after beating Sweden after extra-time in the final and in 2013 the same tournament.

The other sections of Sportivny Klub Obukhovo are association football, volleyball, judo, and field hockey.

References

External links 
 Official website of Obukhovo

1573 establishments in Russia
Populated places established in 1573
Urban-type settlements in Moscow Oblast